Ormea railway station is the train station serving the comune of Ormea, in the Piedmont region, northwestern Italy. It is the junction terminus of the Ceva–Ormea.

The station is currently managed by Rete Ferroviaria Italiana (RFI). However, the passenger building is managed by comune. The station is served only by historic trains, in the service of tourism, in planned dates. The service ordinary It has been suspended from 12 June 2012, by decision of the Piedmont Region. Each of these companies is a subsidiary of Ferrovie dello Stato (FS), Italy's state-owned rail company.

History
The station was opened on 15 February 1893, upon the inauguration the tract from Trappa to Ormea of the Ceva–Ormea railway.

Features
Two tracks, one of which is equipped with platform.

Train services
The station is served by the following services:

Historic train (Treno storico) Turin - Ceva - Ormea

See also

 History of rail transport in Italy
 List of railway stations in Piedmont
 Rail transport in Italy
 Railway stations in Italy

References

External links

Railway stations in Piedmont
Railway stations opened in 1893